The Cinema Audio Society Award for Outstanding Achievement in Sound Mixing for Television Movie or Limited Series is an annual award given by the Cinema Audio Society to live action motion picture sound mixer for their outstanding achievements in sound mixing. The award was first given in 1995, and has been awarded every year since; the only changes with the category have been to its title.

Winners and nominees

1990s
Outstanding Achievement in Sound Mixing for Television

Outstanding Achievement in Sound Mixing for Television - Movie of the Week or Mini-Series

Outstanding Achievement in Sound Mixing for Television - Movie of the Week, Mini-Series or Specials

Outstanding Achievement in Sound Mixing for Television - Movies of the Week and Mini-Series

2000s

Outstanding Achievement in Sound Mixing for Television - Movies and Mini-Series
 

Outstanding Achievement in Sound Mixing for Television Movies and Mini-Series

2010s

Outstanding Achievement in Sound Mixing for Television Movie or Limited Series

2020s

See also
 Primetime Emmy Award for Outstanding Sound Mixing for a Limited or Anthology Series or Movie

References

External links
 Cinema Audio Society Official website

Cinema Audio Society Awards
Awards established in 1993